William Leonard Odenkirk (born October 13, 1965) is an American comedy writer.

Biography
Odenkirk was born in Naperville, Illinois. He is the younger brother of American actor and comedian Bob Odenkirk, and worked as a writer, producer and actor on the HBO sketch comedy TV show Mr. Show with Bob and David, which featured his brother as co-star.  Odenkirk went on to write for Tenacious D, Futurama, and Disenchantment. He has written and executive produced episodes of The Simpsons. He holds a PhD in inorganic chemistry from the University of Chicago.

Writing credits

Tenacious D episodes 
He is credited with writing the following episodes, along with Jack Black, David Cross, Kyle Gass, Tom Gianas, and Bob Odenkirk:
"Death of a Dream"
"The Greatest Song in the World"
"The Fan"
"Road Gig"

Futurama episodes 
He is credited with writing the following episodes:
"How Hermes Requisitioned His Groove Back" (2000)
"A Tale of Two Santas" (2001)
"Insane in the Mainframe" (2001)
"Kif Gets Knocked Up a Notch" (2003)
"The Farnsworth Parabox" (2003)

The Simpsons episodes 
He is credited with writing the following episodes:
"Treehouse of Horror XV" (all three segments) (2004)
"The Seven-Beer Snitch" (2005)
"The Mook, the Chef, the Wife and Her Homer" (2006)
"Crook and Ladder" (2007)
"Double, Double, Boy in Trouble" (2008)
"Million Dollar Maybe" (2010)
"Love Is a Many Strangled Thing" (2011)
"Adventures in Baby-Getting" (2012)
"Pulpit Friction" (2013)
"Super Franchise Me" (2014)
"To Courier with Love" (2016)
"The Last Traction Hero" (2016)
"Grampy Can Ya Hear Me" (2017)
"Forgive and Regret" (2018)
"The Fat Blue Line” (2019)

Disenchantment episodes 
He is credited with writing the following episodes:
"Steamland Confidential" (2021)
"Love Is Hell" (2022)

Guru Nation project 
The untitled series is in development for Paramount+ and is being developed by Bob Odenkirk and David Cross.

References

External links 
 

1965 births
Television producers from Illinois
American television writers
American male television writers
Living people
Writers from Naperville, Illinois
University of Chicago alumni
Emmy Award winners
Comedians from Illinois
Inorganic chemists
Screenwriters from Illinois
21st-century American comedians
Scientists from Illinois
20th-century American comedians
20th-century American male writers
21st-century American male writers
20th-century American writers